A palya is a length of time used in Jainism to describe when the Lord Adinath ("First Lord") came to India, 100,000,000,000,000 palyas ago. A palya is defined as the time it takes to build a cube of lambswool 1 (or possibly 100) yojans high (between 4 and 9 miles  or 6.4 km and 14.5 km), if one strand was laid down every century.

The concept of Palya was born of the desire to quantify relative dimensions in time and space in proportion to the achievement of Nirvana or some similar enlightened state.

See also
Rajju
Religious cosmology
Hindu cosmology
Jain cosmology

References

Units of time
Customary units in India